Valentine Rossbach (1842–1867) was a German-American soldier and member of the 34th New York Battery who fought in the American Civil War and was awarded the Medal of Honor for services in the Battle of Spotsylvania Court House.

Biography
Valentine Rossbach was born in 1842 in Germany.

He enlisted in the 34th New York Battery during the American Civil War.

He received the Medal of Honor for heroism at the Battle of Spotsylvania Court House on May 12, 1864.

His Medal of Honor citation reads as follows:

for extraordinary heroism on 12 May 1864, while serving with 34th New York Battery, in action at Spotsylvania, Virginia. Sergeant Rossbach encouraged his cannoneers to hold a very dangerous position, and when all depended on several good shots it was from his piece that the most effective were delivered, causing the enemy's fire to cease and thereby relieving the critical position of the Federal troops.

Death and burial
Sergeant Rossbach died on February 20, 1897 (aged about 54 or 55) in Flushing, New York. He is buried in Cypress Hills National Cemetery in Booklyn in Section 2, Grave 5427.

References

External links
 

1842 births
1867 deaths
Union Army soldiers
United States Army Medal of Honor recipients
American Civil War recipients of the Medal of Honor
German emigrants to the United States